The J-Cup Tournament is an annual tournament held by Women Superstars Uncensored, in which the winner earns of shot at the WSU Championship.

2008
The tournament was held on March 22, 2008.

2009
The 2009 tournament took place on April 10, 2009 in Bergenfield, New Jersey.

2010
National Wrestling Superstars teamed up with its sister all-ladies promotion Women Superstars Uncensored on April 2 for the 2010 Jersey J-Cup Women’s Tournament in Neptune, New Jersey.

2011
The 2011 J-Cup Tournament was held on April 2, 2011. In the final the former WSU Spirit Champion Brittney Savage defeat the current Spirit Champion Sassy Stephie, to earn a shot at WSU Champion Mercedes Martinez. Brittney will challenge Mercedes Martinez for the WSU Championship on June 25, 2011.

2012
The 2012 J-Cup Tournament was held on April 28, 2012. Two qualifying matches were held at the 5th Anniversary Show on March 3, 2012, which saw Athena defeat Leva Bates, and April Hunter defeat Annie Social. However, due to injury, Hunter had to pull out of the tournament, and Social took her place. Christina von Eerie was also due to take part in the tournament, but travel issues meant that she was replaced by Kimber Lee.

2013

The 2013 J-Cup Tournament was held on October 12, 2013 at WSU's second Secret Show in Vorhees, New Jersey.

See also
British J Cup
Jersey J-Cup
Super J-Cup

References

Women's professional wrestling tournaments
Women Superstars Uncensored